Geranium sanguineum, common names bloody crane's-bill or bloody geranium, is a species of hardy flowering herbaceous perennial plant in the cranesbill family Geraniaceae.  It is also the county flower of Northumberland.

Etymology
The genus name is derived from the Greek γέρανος ("géranos"), meaning crane, with reference to the appearance of the fruit capsule. The specific Latin name sanguineum refers to the red color assumed by the leaves in Autumn.

Description
 The biological form of Geranium sanguineum is hemicryptophyte, as its overwintering buds are situated just below the soil surface and the floral axis is more or less erect with a few leaves. It  has a thick rhizome. The stems are prostrate to ascending, well developed, very branched and hairy. This plant reaches on average  in height. The petiolate leaves have five lobes (or segments), each segment is tripartite in large teeth. The flowers have a diameter of 2.5 to 4 cm. and are purple The flowering period extends from May through October. The flowers are hermaphrodite and pollinated by insects (entomophily). The most common flower visitors are Syrphidae and Hymenoptera, but also butterflies and Coleoptera. The fruit is a schizocarp that breaks up into five mericarps when ripe.

Distribution
Geranium sanguineum is native to Europe and temperate Asia. It is widespread in most of Europe up to Caucasus. In the north-east of Ireland it is a rare garden escape.

Habitat
The typical habitat of this species is grassland, sand dunes and open woodland on calcareous soils, including rocky slopes.

Cultivation
It is cultivated as a garden subject, and a number of different cultivars exist. The following cultivars have gained the Royal Horticultural Society's Award of Garden Merit: 

'Album' 
'Ankum's Pride' 
’Aviemore’ 
'Little Bead' 
'Shepherd's Warning' 
G. sanguineum var. striatum 
Geranium sanguineum var. striatum 'Splendens'

Gallery

References

sanguineum
Plants described in 1753
Taxa named by Carl Linnaeus